Hahaha is a 2010 South Korean comedy-drama film written and directed by Hong Sang-soo. It was entered into the 2010 Cannes Film Festival where it won the Prix Un Certain Regard.

Plot
The filmmaker Jo Moon-kyung (Kim Sang-kyung) and his friend Bang Joong-sik (Yoo Jun-sang) swap memories about the trips they both made to the same town (Tongyeong, South Gyeongsang Province), where, as it turns out, they had met and befriended the same people.

Cast
 Kim Sang-kyung as Jo Moon-kyung, a film director
 Yoo Jun-sang as Bang Joong-sik, a film critic
 Moon So-ri as Wang Seong-ok, a curator of cultural properties
 Ye Ji-won as Ahn Yeon-joo, a girlfriend of Joong-sik
 Kim Kang-woo as Kang Jeong-ho, a poet
 Kim Gyu-ri as Noh Jeong-hwa
 Youn Yuh-jung as Moon-kyung's mother
 Gi Ju-bong as Curator of Tongyeong's local history museum
 Kim Young-ho as Admiral Yi Sun-sin in Moon-kyung's dream

Awards
 Prize un certain regard at the 2010 Cannes Film Festival

References

External links
 
 
 
 
 

2010 films
2010 independent films
2010 comedy-drama films
South Korean independent films
South Korean comedy-drama films
Adultery in films
Films about film directors and producers
Films shot in Seoul
Films directed by Hong Sang-soo
Sponge Entertainment films
2010s Korean-language films
2010s South Korean films